Elachista cerrita is a moth of the family Elachistidae. It is found in Australia.

The wingspan is about 5.5 mm. The ground colour of the forewings is bluish white basally with grey and brown-tipped scales. The hindwings are dark grey.

References

Moths described in 2011
cerrita
Moths of Australia